Tirren Staaf, otherwise known as Pegz (or MC Pegasus), is an Australian hip hop artist and producer hailing from Melbourne, Victoria.  He was the CEO of Obese Records—the record label responsible for artists such as Hilltop Hoods, Downsyde, and Bias B.

Biography
Tirren Staaf has said that he was named after Tiran Porter, former member of the Doobie Brothers.

Pegz has been a part of the Australian hip hop scene since 1992, and has released four full-length studio albums. As a teenager he was first a graffiti artist before becoming a rapper.

In 2000, he got a job at Obese Records, a specialist hip-hop music store in Prahran.

He released his first recording, an EP, Pegasus, on the Obese label in 2001, followed by a studio album, Capricorn Cat in 2003 and Axis in 2005.

In 2005, Pegz toured nationally with Australian Hip Hop Milk Bar Stars (Pegz, Muph, DJ Bonez and Plutonic Lab).

Upon releasing his third solo album, Burn City, in 2007, Pegz nominally retired as a solo artist to concentrate on managing Obese Records.'This will be my last solo effort I think; I'm not in the mental space to be juggling everything right now, but we'll see what happens. I'm always writing. Always.'

In 2009 Pegz, as part of Gully Platoon, together with Dialectrix (a.k.a. Ryan Leaf) and Joe New (Down Under Beats crew), released an album The Great Divide. The album reached #5 on the AIR Top 20 Album charts and #18 on the ARIA Top 40 Urban Album charts. The group released their first video clip for the single "Nothing To Lose" on 15 September 2009.

On 26 January 2011, Obese Records revealed that Pegz would be releasing another solo album entitled Drama. It was released in April 2011.

Discography

Albums

EPs
Pegasus (2001) – Obese (OBR020)

Singles
"Celebrate Daily"/"Rogue"/"Everyshow" (2001)
"12 Apostles" (2002) – Obese (OBR021)
"Back Then" (2005) – Obese (OBR036)
"Chechen Gorilla" (2005) – Obese (OBR037)
"No Attachments" (2008)
"Burn City" (2008)
"Pegz & Silent - Equilibrium feat. Jace XL" (2018)

References

External links
 Official website
 Pegz at Obese Records site

Rappers from Melbourne
Living people
Australian male rappers
Obese Records artists
Obese Records
1975 births